McWhorter is an unincorporated community and coal town in Harrison County, West Virginia, United States.

The community was named after Henry McWhorter, a pioneer settler.

References

Unincorporated communities in Harrison County, West Virginia
Unincorporated communities in West Virginia
Coal towns in West Virginia